Yttrium perchlorate is the inorganic compound with the chemical formula . The compound is an yttrium salt of perchloric acid.

Synthesis
Dissolving yttrium oxide in perchloric acid solution can produce yttrium perchlorate octahydrate.

Chemical properties
Potentially explosive.

Physical properties
The compound is soluble in water and forms a hexahydrate with the formula •6.

References

Perchlorates
Oxidizing agents
Yttrium compounds